Kiniski may refer to:

Julia Kiniski (1899–1969), local politician in Edmonton, Alberta, Canada
Kiniski Gardens, Edmonton, a neighborhood named for Julia Kiniski
Kiniski Elementary School, located in Kiniski Gardens, Edmonton.

People 
Gene Kiniski (1928–2010), Canadian wrestler and one of six children of Julia Kiniski
Kelly Kiniski (born 1960), Canadian wrestler and the older son of Gene Kiniski
Nick Kiniski (born 1961), Canadian wrestler and the younger son of Gene Kiniski

Characters 
"Werewolf Killer Kiniski", a vampire character in the Japanese manga Princess Resurrection
Lewis Kiniski, a character on The Drew Carey Show portrayed by Ryan Stiles